Reyland Capellan (born ) is a Filipino male artistic gymnast, representing his nation at international competitions. He competed at world championships, including the 2015 World Artistic Gymnastics Championships in Glasgow. He also competed in the gymnastics competitions at the 2015 Southeast Asian Games. He got gold on Floor and bronze on Vault. Capellan ended the Philippines' 10-year drought of gold medals, since Roel Ramirez won at the 2005 Games in the Men's Vault. He competed once again in the 2017 Southeast Asian Games and defended his floor title.

References

1983 births
Living people
Filipino male artistic gymnasts
People from Masbate
Southeast Asian Games gold medalists for the Philippines
Southeast Asian Games competitors for the Philippines
Southeast Asian Games bronze medalists for the Philippines
Southeast Asian Games medalists in gymnastics
Gymnasts at the 2014 Asian Games
Gymnasts at the 2018 Asian Games
Competitors at the 2015 Southeast Asian Games
Competitors at the 2017 Southeast Asian Games
Asian Games competitors for the Philippines
Competitors at the 2019 Southeast Asian Games